Giovanni Valiant "Lefty" Beale (June 15, 1922 – July 9, 1970) was an American baseball pitcher in the Negro leagues. He played with the Newark Eagles in 1947.

References

External links
 and Seamheads

Newark Eagles players
1922 births
1970 deaths
Baseball players from Virginia
Baseball pitchers
20th-century African-American sportspeople
Burials at Long Island National Cemetery